Hecho en España is the fifth material release by Mexican pop group RBD, released on October 1, 2007 in Mexico and on October 2, 2007 in Spain.

The concert was shot at the Vicente Calderón Stadium in Madrid, Spain, on June 22, 2007 in front of almost 40,000 people enjoying the group's music.  The DVD shows RBD's concert in Madrid during their "Tour Celestial 2007" in Spain. The DVD was released with special edition packs: one included gloves and a lighter, and another included gloves and an umbrella. The DVD packs went on pre-sale on September 27, 2007 in Mexico, slated for their October 1 release.

An accompanying live album CD of the same name was also released, selling over 100,000 copies in Mexico and Spain. In Brazil, a limited edition of the live album CD, of only which 2,000 copies were produced, was released to celebrate the sales of over 50,000 copies of the DVD in that country.

Background and release
The live concert video was shot at the Vicente Calderón Stadium in the city of Madrid, Spain, from a concert that formed part of RBD's Tour Celestial 2007 world tour. The concert setlist mainly consisted of songs from the group's third and fourth studio albums, Celestial and Rebels.

The DVD was released on October 1, 2007 in Mexico and on October 2, 2007 in Spain. In Brazil, the live concert DVD was released on November 20, 2007. The official release of the DVD, as well of its live album CD counterpart, was held on October 3, 2007 to coincide with RBD's 'Worldwide RBD Day' celebration, which gathered 5,000 fans in an autograph signing that lasted four hours. RBD band member Anahí stated regarding the release in Mexico: "The truth is this is surprising, we're very excited and thankful to know that our Mexican fans follow us every step of the way just like the first day and that the 'Rebeldemania' instead of decreasing continues to grow and we couldn't be happier."

Track listings

DVD 1
"Obertura Celestial" – 0:51
"Cariño Mío" – 3:17
"Ser o Parecer" – 3:23
"Wanna Play" – 3:32
"Bienvenida Maite" – 1:07
"Dame" – 4:11
"Money, Money" – 3:43
"Diálogo Dulce" – 1:29
"Quiero Poder" – 2:46
"Intro Sálvame" – 0:43
"Sálvame" – 3:42
"Medley" ("Solo Quédate en Silencio"/"Enséñame"/"Cuando El Amor Se Acaba"/"Un Poco De Tu Amor"/"Otro Día Que Va") – 6:51
"Video Music Show" – 2:23
"Intro Bésame" – 1:07
"Bésame Sin Miedo" – 3:30
"Besos Puente Musical" – 0:50
"I Wanna Be the Rain" – 4:53
"Presentación Músicos" – 4:11
DVD 2
"Anahí Presenta Algún Día" – 2:07
"Algún Día" – 4:12
"Medley" ("Quizá"/"Este Corazón") – 4:46
"Poema Dulce/Intro No Pares" – 2:24
"No Pares" – 4:51
"Tu Amor" – 5:03
"Intro Fuera" – 3:24
"Nuestro Amor" – 3:56
"Aún Hay Algo" – 3:36
"Intro Tras De Mí" – 0:37
"Tras de Mí" – 3:45
"Celestial" – 3:28
"Rebelde" – 3:21
"Soy Gitano, Grupo Flamenco" – 6:10
"Despedida" – 1:19
"Cariño Mío Reprise" – 1:48
Bonus material
 Detrás de RBD (Behind the scenes) – 2:35

Personnel 
Credits adapted from the DVD's liner notes. 

Recording location
 Vicente Calderón Stadium (Madrid, Spain)

Mastering location
 The Mastering Lab (Ojai, California)

Performance credits
RBD – main artist

Musicians

Güido Laris – bass, musical director
Mauricio Soto "Bicho" – drums
Antonio Carbonell – flamenco ensemble
José Carbonell Muñoz – flamenco ensemble
José Carbonell Serrano – flamenco ensemble
Pedro Gabarre Carbonell – flamenco ensemble

Juan Ramón García Gabarre – flamenco ensemble
Enrique Heredia – flamenco ensemble
Vicente José Suero Vega – flamenco ensemble
Charly Rey – guitar
Gonzalo Velázquez – guitar
Eduardo Tellez – keyboards, piano
Luis Carrillo "Catire" – percussion

Production

Camilo Lara – A&R
Fernando Grediaga – A&R
Diego Torán – A&R
Angélica Pérez Allende – A&R coordination
Güido Laris – arrangements, director, editing, mixing, post-production
Rubén Ramírez – assistant
Roberto Carlos Sánchez – assistant
Luis Luisillo M. – associate producer
Sangwook "Sunny" Nam – DVD audio mastering, DVD video mastering
Grako A. Guilbert – DVD authoring
Pablo Chávez – editing, mixing, post-production
Pedro Damián – executive producer
hulahula.com.mx – graphic design
Televisa En Vivo – management
Juanlu Vela – photography
Carolina Palomo – production coordinator
Fernando Díaz – recording
Pablo Medrano –  recording
Fernando Fernández "Camachete" – recording assistant

Charts and certifications

Weekly charts and certifications

Year-end charts

Release information

See also
Hecho En España (album)

References

External links
Official website confirms the release of the DVD 

2007 video albums
RBD video albums